Mary Stallings Coleman (1914–2001) was a justice of the Michigan Supreme Court from 1973 until 1982.

Coleman was born in Forney, Texas but grew up in Washington, DC.  She did her undergraduate work at the University of Maryland and received her law degree from George Washington University.  Coleman eventually settled in Marshall, Michigan.

She ran for the Michigan Supreme Court in 1972 and won the election and took office in 1973. She ran for re-election 1978. She retired in 1982 two years before her second term was up and Governor William Milliken appointed Lieutenant Governor James Brickley to replace her just before he and Brickley left office.

On the Supreme Court, Coleman was elected the first female chief justice. Coleman is in the University of Maryland Hall of Fame and Michigan Women's Hall of Fame.

See also
List of female state supreme court justices

References

External sources
Biography of Coleman

1914 births
University of Maryland, College Park alumni
George Washington University Law School alumni
Chief Justices of the Michigan Supreme Court
2001 deaths
20th-century American judges
Women chief justices of state supreme courts in the United States
20th-century American women judges
Justices of the Michigan Supreme Court